The 1971 Rothmans Open, also known as the Italian International Open and Bologna WCT, was a men's tennis tournament played on indoor carpet courts that was part of the 1971 World Championship Tennis circuit and took place  in Bologna, Italy. It was the first edition of the tournament and was held from 8 November through 14 November 1971. Rod Laver won the singles title and earned $10,000 first prize money.

Finals

Singles
 Rod Laver defeated  Arthur Ashe 6–3, 6–4, 6–4

Doubles
 Ken Rosewall /  Fred Stolle defeated  Robert Maud /  Frew McMillan 6–7, 6–2, 6–3, 6–3

References

External links
 ATP tournament profile

Rothmans Open
1971 World Championship Tennis circuit
Rothmans Open
November 1971 sports events in Europe